Aharon Zisling (26 February 1901 – 16 January 1964) was an  Israeli politician and minister and a signatory of Israel's declaration of independence.

Biography

Born in Minsk in the Russian Empire (now in Belarus), Zisling emigrated to Palestine in 1904. He was among the founders of Youth Aliyah. As a member of the Haganah command, Zisling  participated in the founding of the Palmach; he was a founder of the Ahdut HaAvoda party, a Jewish Agency delegate to the UN and a member of the Zionist Executive Committee.

Following Israel's declaration of independence in 1948, he was appointed Minister of Agriculture in David Ben-Gurion's provisional government. By then Ahdut HaAvoda had evolved into Mapam.

However, Zisling was a noted critic of Ben-Gurion's policies towards Palestinian Arabs, in particular plans to occupy abandoned villages and to destroy standing Arab crops throughout the country after the 1948 Arab-Israeli conflict.

About the atrocities committed during the war, Zisling told the Provisional State Council (the forerunner to the Knesset), on 17 November 1948:

"I couldn’t sleep all night. I felt that things that were going on were hurting my soul, the soul of my family and all of us here (...) Now Jews too have behaved like Nazis and my entire being has been shaken." 

In 1949 he was elected to the first Knesset, but Mapam were not included in Ben-Gurion's coalition and Zisling lost his place in the cabinet. He was re-elected in 1951, and was part of the faction that broke away from Mapam to recreate Ahdut HaAvoda. He lost his seat in the 1955 elections and did not return to the Knesset.

See also
Qumya

References

External links

1901 births
1964 deaths
People from Minsk Governorate
Belarusian Jews
Jewish atheists
Israeli atheists
Emigrants from the Russian Empire to the Ottoman Empire
Jews in Ottoman Palestine
Jews in Mandatory Palestine
Israeli people of Belarusian-Jewish descent
Haganah members
Ahdut HaAvoda politicians
Mapam politicians
Jewish National Council members
Members of the Assembly of Representatives (Mandatory Palestine)
Signatories of the Israeli Declaration of Independence
Jewish socialists
Members of the 1st Knesset (1949–1951)
Members of the 2nd Knesset (1951–1955)
Ministers of Agriculture of Israel